James Cavanagh or Cavanaugh may refer to:
 James Cavanagh (architect) (1874–1957), Australian architect
 James M. Cavanaugh (1823–1879), U.S. Representative from Minnesota
 James Cavanaugh (songwriter) (1892–1967), American songwriter of the 1940s, the co-writer of the popular jazz tune, "Mississippi Mud"
 James Cavanagh (soldier) (1831–1901), Irish-American brigadier general
 James Cavanagh (baseball) (1850–1890), American baseball player
 James P. Cavanagh (1922–1971), American screenwriter of Playhouse 90 and Murder at the Gallop
 Jim Cavanagh (1913–1990), Australian politician

See also
 James Kavanagh (disambiguation)
 James Kavanaugh (1928–2009), author of A Modern Priest Looks at His Outdated Church